Anjad is a City and a Tehsil in Barwani district in the state of Madhya Pradesh, India.

Geography
It has an average elevation of 151 metres (495 feet).

Demographics
 India census, Anjad had a population of 22,890.

References

Cities and towns in Barwani district